Hugh XI de Lusignan, Hugh VI of La Marche or Hugh II of Angoulême (1221 – 6 April 1250) was a 13th-century French nobleman. He succeeded his mother Isabelle of Angoulême, former queen of England, as Count of Angoulême in 1246. He likewise succeeded his father Hugh X as Count of La Marche in 1249. Hugh XI was the half-brother of King Henry III of England.

Life
Hugh XI was betrothed in 1224 to Joan of Toulouse, the daughter and heiress of Raymond VII, Count of Toulouse and his wife Sancha de Aragón. The betrothal was later broken and Joan was married to Alphonse, Count of Poitiers, brother of King Louis IX of France.

By the Treaty of Vendôme in March 1227, Hugh XI was next betrothed to Isabelle of France, the daughter of Louis VIII of France and Blanche of Castile. However, Isabelle would later break off their marriage plans.

Marriage and family
Hugh XI married Yolande of Brittany (1218 – 1272) in 1236, the daughter of Peter I, Duke of Brittany, Earl of Richmond, and Alix.

 Hugh XII of Lusignan. Married Jeanne de Fougères
   Guy de Lusignan (died 1288/89)
   Geoffrey de Lusignan (died 1264)
 Alice (or Alix) de Lusignan ( after October 1236- May 1290). Married Gilbert de Clare, 7th Earl of Gloucester
   Mary (or Marie) de Lusignan (1242-after 11 July 1266). Married Robert de Ferrers, 6th Earl of Derby
   Isabelle de Lusignan, lady of Belleville (1248–1304). Married Maurice de Belleville
   Yolande de Lusignan (died 10 November 1305). Married Pierre I, seigneur of Préaux

Hugh XI's wife Yolande never remarried.

Death
In 1249 he agreed to serve the count of Poitiers for a year on the Seventh Crusade.  Hugh was killed on 6 April 1250 during the Battle of Fariskur, which was the last major battle of the Seventh Crusade. He was on crusade with Louis IX of France. His son Hugh XII succeeded him as Count of La Marche and Angoulême.

Notes

References

Sources

Further reading
 Bibliothèque de l’École des Chartes 4th Ser. 2 (1856): 537–545.
 Douet d’Arcq, Collection de Sceaux des Archives de l’Empire 1(1) (1863): 398 (seal of Hugues XI de Lusignan dated 1246 — Sceau équestre.  Costume de chasse comme au sceau précédent.  Legend: ……..VGONIS ……..; Revers.  Écu burelé, à six lions rampants faisant l’orle brochant sur le tout.  Legend: ……..M . HVGON……..), 398–399 (seal of Yolande, Countess of La Marche & Angoulême dated 1250 — La comtesse debout, vue de face et tenant un oiseau au poing.  Legend: S. YOLENDIS : VXORIS : [D]NI : HVGONIS : .RVN; Contre-sceau.  Écu burelé, à cinq lionceaux en orle brochant sur le tout.  Legend: + SECRETVM . DNE . YOLENDIS :).
 Delisle Chronologie Hist. des Comtes de la Marche (Bull. Société Archéologique et Hist. de la Charente) 4th Ser. 4 (1867): 3–16.
 Duval, Cartulaire de l’Abbaye royale de Notre-Dame des Châtelliers (1872): 82–85 (testament of Hugues [X] de Lusignan dated 1248).
 Inventaire Sommaire des Archives départmentales antérieures à 1790: Haute Vienne, Série H. Supp. (1884–7): 58.
 La Porta, Les Gens de Qualité en Basse-Marche 1(2) (1886): 1–60 (Généalogie de Lusignan).
 Cal. Charter Rolls, 1 (1903): 438–439.
 Genealogist n.s. 21 (1905): 78–82, 163–171, 234–243.
 Cal.Patent Rolls, 1247–1258 (1908): 35 (Hugh le Brun, Count of Angoulême, styled "king’s brother" by King Henry III of England in 1249), 130, 175, 317 (Hugh, Count of La Marche, styled "king’s brother").
 Recueil des Docs. de l’Abbaye de Fontaine-le-Comte (Société des archives historiques du Poitou 61) (1982): 82 (testament of Hugues [X] de Lusignan dated 1248).
 Schwennicke Europäische Stammtafeln n.s. 3(4) (1989): 816 (sub Lusignan).
 Jackson Seventh Crusade, 1244–1254 (2009) 34–35.

1221 births
1250 deaths
Counts of Angoulême
Counts of La Marche
House of Lusignan
13th-century French people
Military personnel killed in action
Christians of the Seventh Crusade